A Double Life or Double Destiny (French: Double destin, German: Das zweite Leben) is a 1954 French-West German drama film based upon the play by Jean Giraudoux, directed by Victor Vicas and starring Michel Auclair, Simone Simon and Barbara Rütting. It was shot at the Wiesbaden Studios in Hesse and on location around Paris and Kiedrich in the Rhineland. The film's sets were designed by the art directors Alfred Bütow and Ernst Schomer.

Cast
 Michel Auclair as Jacques Frontenac  
 Simone Simon as Françoise Dunoyer  
 Barbara Rütting as Sybil  
 Bernhard Wicki as Rainer von Hohenburg  
 Yves Brainville as Garreau  
 Gert Fröbe as Mittelmeier  
 Rolf von Nauckhoff as Professeur Werner  
 Walter Clemens as L'Italien  
 Georges Vitray as Gervais  
 Herbert von Boxberger 
 Otto Friebel 
 Marcel Rouzé 
 Yvonne Yma
 Elisabeth Scherer

References

Bibliography 
 Goble, Alan. The Complete Index to Literary Sources in Film. Walter de Gruyter, 1999.

External links 
 

1954 films
1954 drama films
French drama films
German drama films
West German films
1950s German-language films
Films directed by Victor Vicas
Films about amnesia
Films about fictional painters
French films based on plays
German black-and-white films
French black-and-white films
1950s French films
1950s German films
Films shot in Paris